Ortholepis rhodorella is a moth of the family Pyralidae. It was described by James Halliday McDunnough in 1958. It is found in North America, including Maine and Nova Scotia.

The wingspan is about 17 mm. The ground color of the forewings is light gray. The basal area is gray, at the extreme base with darker sprinkling. The hindwings are dull ochreous, shaded with smoky along the outer margin.

References

Moths described in 1958
Phycitini